William Jedediah "Jed" Dupree (born October 7, 1979) is an American men's foil fencer.  He was the 2001 NCAA Champion in individual men's foil, and the 2002 and 2005 National Champion in individual foil.  He represented the United States at the 2004 Summer Olympics and won a gold medal in team foil at the 2003 Pan American Games.  

He is currently a head foil coach at Fencers Club in New York, NY. On August 12, 2013, Harvard announced that Dupree had been hired as an assistant coach.

He fenced for the Columbia Lions fencing team.  Dupree graduated from Columbia University in 2001.

References 

1979 births
Living people
American male foil fencers
Columbia Lions fencers
Fencers at the 2004 Summer Olympics
Olympic fencers of the United States
People from Hanover, New Hampshire
Sportspeople from New Hampshire
Pan American Games gold medalists for the United States
Pan American Games medalists in fencing
Fencers at the 2003 Pan American Games
Medalists at the 2003 Pan American Games